Bernard Le Roux (born 4 June 1989) is a South African-born French rugby union player, who currently plays flanker for French Top 14 side Racing 92.

As indicated by his family name, Bernard Le Roux has French roots, his Le Roux ancestor originated from Normandy. On 11 July 2013, he stated to the French sport newspaper L'Equipe, "I've done some research, my family originated from the Nantes area. They first moved to Belgium and then to South Africa, a few centuries ago."

Career
Bernard's rugby career started out when playing for amateur club side A.S.R.V. Ascrum in Amsterdam. In 2009, he represented the Boland Cavaliers in the 2009 Vodacom Cup, where the Cavaliers finished sixth in the Southern Section. He played in just 4 matches that season, all of them brief appearances from the bench. In addition to the Cavaliers, he spent some time with the Border Bulldogs during the 2009 Currie Cup First Division, in which the Bulldogs finished fifth in the Division.

Le Roux was tempted by Rugby World Cup winning coach Jake White to sign with the Lions for the 2010 Super 14 season. However, a call the night before he was due to sign the Lions contract convinced him that a short-term medical wildcard contract with Racing 92, then known as Racing Métro, would be better – with the aim of perhaps signing with the Lions after the stint was over. However, Le Roux explains that he "fell in love with the country, the culture and the rugby environment", and remained on with Racing Métro after his short-term contract.

He signed a three-year contract to start with, but a call up to the French senior squad for the 2013 French tour of New Zealand, being eligible through residency laws, was too tempting to decline, and a re-sign with Racing Métro was inevitable after the tour with 'Les Bleus'. He made his first appearance for France when playing against Super Rugby side the Auckland Blues on 11 June 2013. He started in what was a 38–15 victory. Le Roux made his test debut 4 days later in Christchurch, starting and playing the full 80 minutes in a 30–0 defeat to the All Blacks.

Since being named in that 38-man squad for the All Blacks tour, Le Roux has featured in every French squad Philippe Saint-André has announced, with Saint-André "looking to build something for the next World Cup" (the 2015 Rugby World Cup).

He represented France for the first time in the 2019 Rugby World Cup, starting in the game against the USA.

Honours
 Racing 92
Top 14: 2015–16

External links
France profile at FFR

References

1989 births
Living people
Afrikaner people
France international rugby union players
French people of South African descent
Racing 92 players
Rugby union flankers
Rugby union players from Moorreesburg
South African people of French descent
People of Norman descent